Maid of Kent may refer to:

Joan of Kent, 14th century Countess of Kent and Princess of Wales
Elizabeth Barton, known as the Maid of Kent (1506? – 1534), prophetess executed during the reign of Henry VIII
Maid of Kent, colloquial title for any woman born in East Kent, England
Maid of Kent (steam locomotive), miniature steam locomotive 
SS Maid of Kent, a British ferry later converted to a hospital ship, sunk by the Luftwaffe in 1940